Fox 15 may refer to one of the following television stations in the United States, affiliated with the Fox Broadcasting Company:

Current
KADN-TV in Lafayette, Louisiana
KVRR in Fargo, North Dakota
KXVA in Abilene, Texas
KYOU-TV in Ottumwa, Iowa

Former
KNXV-TV in Phoenix, Arizona (1986 to 1994)
WPMI-TV in Mobile, Alabama / Pensacola, Florida (1986 to 1996)